Jach'a Pukara (Aymara jach'a big, pukara fortress, "big fortress", Hispanicized spelling Jachcha Pucara) is a mountain in the Andes of Bolivia, about  high. It is situated in the La Paz Department, Larecaja Province, Sorata Municipality. Jach'a Pukara lies between Lake Titicaca in the west and the Janq'u Uma-Illampu massif of the Cordillera Real in the east.

References 

Mountains of La Paz Department (Bolivia)